Deus ludens is the concept of a playful God, and/or is happy and joyful. Deus ludens is related to deus faber, the concept of God as a craftsman or an engraver.

In the Bible, God is portrayed as "playful" in one verse, which is used as evidence by supporters of a deus ludens God. In , God plays with wisdom.

See also 
 Deus

References 

Conceptions of God